Jasmin Agović (born 13 February 1991) is a Montenegrin footballer who plays for FK Podgorica as a goalkeeper.

References

External links

1991 births
Living people
Footballers from Podgorica
Association football goalkeepers
Montenegrin footballers
Montenegro youth international footballers
Montenegro under-21 international footballers
FK Budućnost Podgorica players
KF Vllaznia Shkodër players
FK Rudar Pljevlja players
FK Podgorica players
Montenegrin First League players
Montenegrin Second League players
Kategoria Superiore players
Montenegrin expatriate footballers
Expatriate footballers in Albania
Montenegrin expatriate sportspeople in Albania